Otar Japaridze (born December 23, 1987) is a Georgian former competitive ice dancer. With former partner Allison Reed, he represented Georgia at the 2010 Winter Olympics. He later skated with Angelina Telegina.

Personal life 
Otar Japaridze was born in Tbilisi, Georgian SSR, Soviet Union. His father, Irakli Japaridze, is the president of the Georgian Figure Skating Federation.

Career 
Japaridze competed in single skating until the age of 15 and then switched to ice dancing. From 2002 through 2004, he competed with Marina Sheltsina. They were the 2004 Georgian national champions.

From 2005 through 2007, Japaridze competed with Russian-born Ekaterina Zaikina for Georgia. They competed twice at the World Junior Championships.

In the 2007–2008 season, Japaridze competed with American ice dancer Isabella Tobias for Georgia.

In May 2009, Japaridze teamed up with American Allison Reed to compete for Georgia; they trained in Mount Laurel, New Jersey with coach and choreographer Evgeni Platov. At the 2009 Nebelhorn Trophy, they qualified a spot for Georgia for the 2010 Winter Olympics. Reed received a Georgian passport in January 2010, allowing them to compete at the 2010 Winter Olympics. Reed and Japaridze split following the 2010-11 season.

In February 2012, Japaridze teamed up with Russian ice dancer Angelina Telegina to compete for Georgia.

Programs

With Telegina

With Reed

With Tobias

With Zaikina

With Sheltsina

Results 
JGP: Junior Grand Prix

With Telegina

With Reed

With Tobias

With Zaikina

With Sheltsina

References

External links 

 
 
 
 
 

1987 births
Figure skaters at the 2010 Winter Olympics
Olympic figure skaters of Georgia (country)
Living people
Sportspeople from Tbilisi
Male ice dancers from Georgia (country)
Male dancers from Tbilisi